The Government of Colorado is the governmental structure as established by the Constitution of the State of Colorado. It is composed of three branches: the executive branch headed by the Governor, the legislative branch consisting of the General Assembly, and the judicial branch consisting of the Supreme Court and lower courts. The constitution also allows direct participation of the electorate by initiative, referendum, recall and ratification.

Executive
The statewide elected officers are:

The Lieutenant Governor is elected on a ticket with the Governor. All statewide elected officers serve four-year terms. There are also elected members of the Colorado State Board of Education, and the Regents of the University of Colorado are elected from districts coterminous with Colorado's congressional districts or at large. As a result, the Governor does not have direct management authority over either the Department of Education or any of the state's institutions of higher education.

The executive branch is otherwise composed of the principal departments:

 Department of Agriculture (CDA) 
 Department of Corrections (CDOC)
 Department of Early Childhood (CDEC)
 Department of Education (CDE)
 Department of Health Care Policy and Financing (HCPF)
 Department of Higher Education (CDHE)
 Department of Human Services (CDHS)
 Department of Labor and Employment (CDLE)
 Department of Law (DOL)
 Department of Local Affairs (DOLA)
 Department of Military and Veterans Affairs (DMVA)
 Department of Natural Resources (CDNR) 
 Department of Personnel and Administration (DPA)
 Department of Public Health and Environment (CDPHE)
 Department of Public Safety (CDPS)
 Department of Regulatory Agencies (DORA)
 Department of Revenue (DOR)
 Department of State (DOS)
 Department of Transportation (CDOT)
 Department of the Treasury (CDT)

Regulations are published in the Colorado Register and codified in the Code of Colorado Regulations (CCR).

Legislature

The legislative body of Colorado is the Colorado General Assembly made up of two houses, the House of Representatives and the Colorado Senate.  Members of the House are elected for two year terms from single-member, equal population districts.  Approximately half of the members of the state senate are elected each two years to four year terms from single-member, equal population districts. The House of Representatives has 65 members and the Senate has 35 for a total of 100 legislators in Colorado. The session laws are published in the Session Laws of Colorado. The laws of a general and permanent nature are codified in the Colorado Revised Statutes (C.R.S.).

Direct democracy
In addition to providing for voting, the people of Colorado have reserved to themselves the:

 initiative of laws,
 referendum of other legislative acts, and
 recall of office holders.

Judiciary

The judiciary of Colorado is defined by Article VI of the Colorado Constitution as well as the law of Colorado. The administration of the state judicial system is the responsibility of the Chief Justice of the Colorado Supreme Court as its executive head, and is assisted by several other commissions. Colorado courts include the:

 Colorado Supreme Court,
 Colorado Court of Appeals,
 Colorado district courts,
 Colorado county courts,
 Colorado water courts,
 Colorado municipal courts.

All of the courts above, other than municipal courts and Denver's county court, are part of the state court system. In Denver, county and municipal courts are integrated and are not part of the state court system for administrative purposes, and the Denver Probate Court and the Denver Juvenile Court have jurisdiction over probate and juvenile matters, respectively. Outside Denver, these matters are within the jurisdiction of the district courts.

Most crimes in Colorado are prosecuted by a district attorney. One district attorney is elected for each of the state's 22 judicial districts in a partisan election. The state attorney general also has power to prosecute certain crimes, and in rare circumstances a special prosecutor may be appointed to prosecute a crime on a case by case basis. Municipal ordinance violations are prosecuted by city attorneys.

Local government

Colorado is divided into 64 counties. Counties are important units of government in Colorado since the state has no secondary civil subdivisions, such as townships. Two of these counties, the City and County of Denver and the City and County of Broomfield, have consolidated city and county governments. A municipality may extend into multiple counties.

The 272 Colorado municipalities operate under one of five types of municipal governing authority:
 2 consolidated city and county governments
 61 cities and 35 towns that are home rule municipalities
 12 statutory cities
 161 statutory towns
 1 territorial charter municipality

There are no township governments in Colorado, but there are more than 4,000 special districts. See Active Colorado Local Governments.

Other political subdivisions include the University of Colorado Hospital Authority which supports education, research, and public service activities, and which provides patient care through UCHealth (University of Colorado Health).

Other governments
There are two federally recognized tribes that overlap Colorado: the Southern Ute Indian Tribe and the Ute Mountain Ute Tribe. There are no other known state-recognized tribes.

See also
 Elections in Colorado
 Politics of Colorado
 Law of Colorado

References

External links
 Colorado.gov
 Colorado Information Marketplace
 State of Colorado recipient profile on USAspending.gov

 
Colorado